Matinee Idol is a 1933 British crime film directed by George King and starring Camilla Horn, Miles Mander and Marguerite Allan. The screenplay concerns a young actress who is suspected of murder. It was shot at Wembley Studios in London. The film's sets were designed by the art director J. Elder Wills. It was a quota quickie distributed by United Artists.

Plot summary
A young actress is suspected of murder when a matinee idol she had prevented seducing her sister is found dead.

Cast
 Camilla Horn as Sonia Vance 
 Miles Mander as Harley Travers 
 Marguerite Allan as Christine Vance 
 Viola Keats as Gladys Wheeler 
 Anthony Hankey as Sir Brian Greville 
 Hay Petrie as Mr Clappit 
 Margaret Yarde as Mrs Clappit 
 Barry Livesey as Bert 
 John Turnbull as Inspector North 
 Albert Whelan as Barlow

References

Bibliography
 Chibnall, Steve. Quota Quickies: The Birth of the British 'B' Film. British Film Institute, 2007.
 Low, Rachael. Filmmaking in 1930s Britain. George Allen & Unwin, 1985.
 Wood, Linda. British Films, 1927-1939. British Film Institute, 1986.

External links

1933 films
Films directed by George King
British black-and-white films
British crime drama films
1933 crime drama films
1930s English-language films
1930s British films
Films shot at Wembley Studios
United Artists films
Quota quickies